Mambasa Territory is an administrative area in the Ituri Province of the Democratic Republic of the Congo. 
The headquarters is in the town of Mambasa.
Mambasa Territory is threatened with deforestation due to illegal forestry to meet high demand for lumber by the bordering countries of Rwanda, Uganda, Burundi and Kenya, as well as to slash and burn cultivation and growing demand for fuel-wood by large numbers of immigrants from the east.

Towns and villages
Mambasa
Nia Nia

Divisions
Administrative divisions are:
Bombo Chiefdom
Bandaka Chiefdom
Babila-Babombi Chiefdom
Mambasa Chiefdom
Walese-Dese Chiefdom
Walese-Karo Chiefdom
Bakwanza Chiefdom

Politics
Mambasa Territory is represented in the National Assembly by two deputies:
Jefferson Abdallah (PPRD)
Grégoire Lusenge (RCD/K-ML)

References

Territories of Ituri Province